Grenada Grenadines may refer to:
 The islands of the Grenadines belonging to the country Grenada
 The name used on some postage stamps of Grenada